The Kawanishi K-3 was a Japanese, fast, multi-purpose civil transport aircraft from the early 1920s. Despite its good performance it was eclipsed by the release of Army surplus machines and only one was built.

Design and development

The K-3, completed in October 1921, was designed as a fast civil transport able to carry two passengers or mail and other cargo. It was a development of the Kawanishi K-1 completed in December 1920 and was more powerful, aerodynamically cleaner and faster. Like most aircraft of its period it had a wooden structure and was fabric-covered.

It was a single bay biplane with rectangular plan wings braced by parallel pairs of interplane struts. The upper wing was joined to the upper fuselage by a cabane formed by pairs of transverse outward-leaning inverted V-struts to the forward wing spar and similar but longitudinal V's to the rear. The lower wing was joined as usual to the lower fuselage longerons.

At the end of World War I Japan received a large number of Maybach engines, designed to power airships, as part of its war reparations. The K-3 was the first Japanese aircraft to use one, a Maybach Mb.IVa six cylinder, water-cooled, upright straight engine producing . Its radiator was mounted horizontally in the upper wing centre section to reduce drag. It was nose-mounted and smoothly faired into the fuselage behind. An open, underwing cockpit seated two passengers side-by-side, with the pilot in a second open cockpit well behind the wing trailing edges.

The K-3 had a fixed, conventional undercarriage with mainwheels on a single axle with pairs of faired landing legs and rearward drag struts mounted on the lower fuselage longerons. There was a short tailskid.

Operational history

The K-3 first flew in the early winter of 1921. It was the fastest civil aircraft in Japan, with the speed of a fighter and the load-carrying ability of a light bomber. Kawanishi had hopes of commercial success but instead the light civil transport market was filled by the lower-powered and slower Nakajima Type 5 Trainers released by the Army and no more K-3s were built.

In 1926 the sole K-3 was modified to take a straight six,  Benz Bz.IIIaV (Benz Bz.IV) engine as well as other changes to become the Kawanishi K-3B.

Variants
Kawanishi K-3 Prototype with  Maybach Mb.IVa.    
Kawanishi K-3B Prototype with  Benz Bz.IV and airframe modifications.

Specifications (K-3)

Notes

References

Biplanes
Single-engined tractor aircraft
1930s Japanese civil utility aircraft
Kawanishi aircraft